The Jamaica national ice hockey team is the national men's ice hockey team of Jamaica. They are controlled by the Jamaican Olympic Ice Hockey Federation and became an associate member of the International Ice Hockey Federation (IIHF) since 18 May 2012. Jamaica is currently not ranked in the IIHF World Ranking and has not entered in any IIHF World Championship events. Jamaica made its international debut in 2019, at the Latin American Tournament, known as the Amerigol LATAM Cup, in the United States.

History
Jamaica joined the IIHF on 18 May 2012 and became the first Caribbean nation to accomplish this. In order to compete at the Winter Olympics, they must have full inclusion from the IIHF, which requires the nation to have at least one ice rink and a development program. Jamaica currently does not possess an ice rink.

Recently they have held tryouts in Canada to form a national team that can compete in the future Winter Olympics, roughly two dozen players were part of the tryouts. Due to the tryouts being held in Canada, some accused the team of attempting to "poach" from Canadian talent. Former NHL player, Graeme Townshend is leading the tryouts in order to construct a national team. The current stated goal of the organization is to have a national team compete in the Winter Olympics within next 20 years.

There are notable players of Jamaican-origin in Canada, the Subban brothers, P. K., Malcolm and Jordan, all of whom were selected in the NHL Entry Draft in their respective years 2007, 2012 and 2013, with P. K. played for 13 seasons in the NHL with the Montreal Canadiens, the Nashville Predators and the New Jersey Devils, and Malcolm currently playing for the Rochester Americans in the AHL, an affiliate of the Buffalo Sabres. P. K. has represented Canada in international competitions, and won the gold medal at the 2014 Winter Olympics in Sochi, Russia. Anthony and Chris Stewart and Josh Ho-Sang who also played in the NHL, with Ho-Sang playing for the Salavat Yulaev Ufa in the KHL. Graeme Townshend became the first Jamaican-born player to play in the NHL, and played for two seasons with the early 1990s Boston Bruins, the New York Islanders and for one season with the Ottawa Senators. Townshend was born in Kingston. Jermaine Loewen played for five seasons in the Canadian major junior hockey league, the Western Hockey League (WHL), with the Kamloops Blazers, was selected in the seventh round (199th overall) by the Dallas Stars in the 2018 draft, and became the first Jamaican-born player to be selected in the draft. Loewen was born in Mandeville.

National team
On 6 September 2019, Jamaica played its first international game against other national team at the Amerigol LATAM Cup in Coral Springs, Florida, United States. They defeated Colombia 5–0 and later defeating Argentina 8–4. Jamaica went on to win the Amerigol LATAM Cup after a 3–2 win in a shootout over the defending champion Colombia.

Tournament record

Olympic Games

World Championship

Amerigol LATAM Cup

Roster
Roster for the 2019 LATAM Cup.

Head coach:  Cyril Bollers

Fixtures and results

All-time record against other national teams
Last match update: 16 October 2021

References

External links
Official Website of the Jamaican Olympic Ice Hockey Federation

Ice hockey in Jamaica
National ice hockey teams in the Americas
Ice hockey